The Smiths Indeed are a tribute band dedicated to The Smiths. The band are from Liverpool in the North West of England. Morrissey Indeed and The Smiths Presumably are a continuation of The Smiths Indeed and are based in Antwerp, Belgium.

History
The Smiths Indeed were formed in Liverpool in 2005. They played their first show in Glasgow at Bar Bia on 10 December 2005. They quickly gained a reputation for excellent live shows. They have played multiple extensive UK tours, playing prestigious venues such as Manchester Apollo, London Shepherd's Bush Empire and Glasgow Old Fruitmarket. They have also toured Europe and North America. In 2016, they played two shows at the Smiths Morrissey Convention at Avalon Hollywood in Los Angeles. The band strive to recreate the experience of seeing a mid-1980s Smiths concert. In order to get the atmosphere just right, they pay particular attention to using authentic instruments and equipment.

The Smiths Indeed name is taken from the run-out grooves etching on the vinyl of the 1984 Smiths single, "Heaven Knows I'm Miserable Now". A Smiths fanzine called Smiths Indeed also existed between 1986 and 1989.

The musicians are from various well-known Liverpool-based bands such as The Christians, Pete Wylie and Maudlin Rich.

In 2017, singer Jürgen Wendelen formed Morrissey Indeed as a continuation of The Smiths Indeed. Morrissey Indeed are based in Antwerp, Belgium and continue to tour in the UK and Europe. From 2019, they also tour as The Smiths Presumably.

Setlist
The setlist consists of songs from The Smiths's extensive repertoire. They do not play any Morrissey solo songs.
Sample setlist (Newcastle Academy, 7 December 2007):
Intro music: Dance Of The Knights (Prokofiev)
Sheila Take A Bow / Nowhere Fast / Heaven Knows I'm Miserable Now / This Charming Man / Still Ill / Reel Around The Fountain / What Difference Does It Make / Hand In Glove / These Things Take Time / William, It Was Really Nothing / Cemetery Gates / What She Said / Barbarism Begins At Home / Stretch Out And Wait / Stop Me If You Think You've Heard This One Before / Ask / Panic
The Queen Is Dead / Please Please Please Let Me Get What I Want / Girlfriend In A Coma / Bigmouth Strikes Again
Shoplifters Of The World Unite / There Is A Light That Never Goes Out

Band members
 Jürgen Wendelen (Morrissey) - Vocals (2006 - 2017)
 Liam Atkinson (Johnny Marr) - Guitars (2006 -2007 / 2012 - )
 Bobby Kewley (Andy Rourke) - Bass
 Paul Tsanos (Mike Joyce) - Drums

Band members (previous)
 Simon McKelvie (Johnny Marr) - Guitars (2006 / 2008 - 2011)
 Nick Astle (Johnny Marr) - Guitars (2005)
 Roy Verbeke (Andy Rourke) - Bass (2012)
 Peter Muldoon (Andy Rourke) - Bass (2008)

References

External links
The Smiths Indeed's official website
The Smiths Indeed on Soundcloud
Dublin Button Factory review

Tribute bands
English rock music groups